The Harrison Courthouse Square Historic District is an area of Harrison, Arkansas.  It is known by residents simply as "the Square". The Harrison Courthouse Square Historic District includes the 1911 Boone County Courthouse, two pharmacies, several clothing stores and restaurants, and a Marine Corps Legacy Museum. The District also has a bank and the Lyric Theater. The District is the site of several annual festivals, including Crawdad Days and the Fall Festival. Several war memorials stand on the Courthouse lawn. The Square is known as the site of the shooting of famous outlaw Henry Starr.

Most of the square's buildings were built between 1895 and 1948, earlier buildings having been predominantly wooden in construction.  The district that was listed on the National Register of Historic Places in 1999 has 54 historically significant buildings, including most of those facing the 1911 courthouse, and a few on the immediately adjacent city blocks.

See also
National Register of Historic Places listings in Boone County, Arkansas

Notes

Buildings and structures in Harrison, Arkansas
Historic districts on the National Register of Historic Places in Arkansas
National Register of Historic Places in Boone County, Arkansas
Courthouses on the National Register of Historic Places in Arkansas
Buildings and structures completed in 1905
1905 establishments in Arkansas
Buildings designated early commercial in the National Register of Historic Places in Arkansas